Redesign My Brain is an Australian TV series presented by and starring Todd Sampson. It follows Sampson in his quest to expand the boundaries of his brain. It is currently aired on ABC Australia. Six episodes have been produced so far. It won the AACTA Award for Best Documentary Television Program and the ATOM Awards for Best Factual Television Series and Best Documentary – Science, Technology & the Environment.

Episode list

Season 1 (2013)

Season 2 (2015)

Awards

International broadcast
  — Discovery Channel India has broadcast the show in India.
  - La 2 is currently (may 2020) airing the series.

References

External links
 
 
 http://mindfulmedia.com.au/redesign-my-brain/
 http://mindfulmedia.com.au/redesign-my-brain-series-2/

2013 Australian television series debuts
2010s Australian documentary television series
Australian Broadcasting Corporation original programming
Todd Sampson